Progressive History XXX is a three-disc compilation album by British electronica group Fluke, first released in September 2002. It is not to be confused with Progressive History X, their previous one-disc compilation album. Artwork was again David Bethell's "Just Your Average Second On This Planet" 1997-1998 (Discotheque) but this time came in four gloss print versions of black, red, white and blue. A free poster also contained the silhouette image on one side with all other album covers portrayed on the flip. Progressive History XXX is a three CD box-set including many rare and hard to find mixes.

Track listing

Disc one: Early Stuff
"Thumper" (Original Mix) (from Thumper!, 1989) – 5:56
"Philly (Jamateur Mix)" (original version on The Techno Rose of Blighty, 1991) – 5:38
"Glorious" (from The Techno Rose of Blighty, 1991) – 5:55
"Easy Peasy" (original version on The Techno Rose of Blighty, 1991) – 4:11
"Pan Am into Philly" (from Out (In Essence), 1991) – 5:35
"Heresy/Garden of Blighty" (from Out (In Essence), 1991) – 9:49
"Jig" (original version on The Peel Sessions, 1994) – 5:05
"Phin" (from The Techno Rose of Blighty, 1991) – 6:30
"Taxi" (from The Techno Rose of Blighty, 1991) – 4:14
"Coolest" (from The Techno Rose of Blighty, 1991) – 2:54
"The Bells" (from Out (In Essence), 1991) – 5:41

Disc two: Album Tracks
 "Spacey (Catch 22 Dub)" (from Six Wheels on My Wagon, 1993) – 6:10
 "Astrosapiens" (from Six Wheels on My Wagon, 1993) – 6:50
 "Life Support" (from Six Wheels on My Wagon, 1993) – 6:31
 "Cut" (from Oto, 1995) – 6:41
 "Wobbler" (from Oto, 1995) – 8:47
 "OK" (from Oto, 1995) – 7:49
 "Kitten Moon" (from Risotto, 1997) – 10:16
 "Bermuda" (original version on Risotto, 1997) – 7:59
 "Setback" (from Risotto, 1997) – 8:43
 "Goodnight Lover" (from Risotto, 1997) – 7:17

Disc three: Rare Mixes
 "Slid (Scat and Sax Frenzy)" (original version on Six Wheels on My Wagon, 1993) – 6:46
 "Electric Guitar (Headstock)" (original version on Six Wheels on My Wagon, 1993) – 5:35
 "Groovy Feeling (Screwball)" (original version on Oto, 1995) – 7:10
 "Bubble (Braillebubble)" (original version on Oto, 1995) – 6:43
 "Bullet (Atlas Space Base)" (original version on Oto, 1995) – 9:25
 "Bullet (Jazz Mix)" (original version on Oto, 1995) – 2:00
 "Tosh (Nosh)" (original version on Oto, 1995) – 6:26
 "Atom Bomb (Atomix 4)" (original version on Risotto, 1997) – 10:13
 "Absurd (Marine Parade Mix)" (original version on Risotto, 1997) – 6:38
 "Absurd (Soul of Man Remix)" (original version on Risotto, 1997) – 7:36
 "Squirt (The Europicolamix)" (original version on Oto, 1995) – 7:13

Fluke (band) albums
2002 compilation albums
Astralwerks compilation albums